A. Lehman Engel (born September 14, 1910, Jackson, Mississippi - died August 29, 1982, New York City) was an American composer and conductor of Broadway musicals, television and film.

Work in theatre, television and films
Engel worked in a variety of positions on television specials. He was composer and conductor of the music for the famed 1954 television production of Shakespeare's Macbeth, starring Maurice Evans and Judith Anderson, but did not work on the 1960 remake starring the same two actors. 

He was conductor of the first (and so far, the only) television version of Leonard Bernstein's Wonderful Town (1958) (TV), as well as, in the preceding years, of the Hallmark Hall of Fame productions of Shakespeare's The Taming of the Shrew in 1956, Twelfth Night in 1957, and The Tempest in 1960, all with Maurice Evans. He also conducted the music for the Broadway musical version of Li'l Abner, but not for the 1959 film version of the show. The music in the film was conducted by Joseph J. Lilley. He also musically directed and vocally arranged the 1959 musical Take Me Along.

Engel also composed the music for the 1939 Broadway revival of Hamlet, starring Maurice Evans, as well as for the original 1948 stage production of Maxwell Anderson's Anne of the Thousand Days, starring Rex Harrison and Joyce Redman. 

In 1965, he served as the musical director for the Broadway production of La Grosse Valise (composer Gérard Calvi, lyrics by Harold Rome)

The BMI Lehman Engel Musical Theatre Workshop

Engel founded the BMI Lehman Engel Musical Theatre Workshop, a workshop in New York for musical theatre composers, lyricists and librettists. Engel also founded and personally supervised the Lehman Engel Musical Theater Workshop, originally based at the Performing Arts Center of the Los Angeles County Music Center in Los Angeles.

Lehman Engel worked as musical director for the St. Louis Municipal Opera for a number of years before moving to New York to conduct on Broadway. He won 6 Tony Awards, and was nominated for 4 more. The category for which he won and was nominated no longer exists.

Recordings
Engel also conducted the first 3-LP version of George Gershwin's opera Porgy and Bess, a 1951 Columbia Masterworks Records album which was highly acclaimed, but did not, as advertised, really feature the complete opera. The mono recording, starring Lawrence Winters and Camilla Williams, was eventually released on CD. It was the longest Porgy and Bess album made up to that time (129 minutes), and would remain so for many years, until it was superseded in the 1970s by two complete recordings of the opera which both won Grammys.

Between the late 1940s and early 1950s, under the supervision of Columbia Records executive Goddard Lieberson, Engel conducted what were then the most complete recordings of several classic Broadway musicals of the past, many of which were appearing as albums for the first time - among them Girl Crazy (with Mary Martin performing both Ginger Rogers and Ethel Merman's old stage roles), Oh, Kay! (with Barbara Ruick as Kay and Jack Cassidy as Jimmy de Winter), Babes in Arms (again featuring Cassidy and Mary Martin), and Pal Joey (with Harold Lang in the title role and Vivienne Segal repeating her original 1940 stage role as Vera Simpson). All of these were studio recordings, not original cast albums. The Pal Joey recording was so successful that it actually led to a major, long-running revival of the show in 1952, with the same two stars who had appeared on the album, Vivienne Segal (who had also starred in the original 1940 stage production) and Harold Lang.

He also conducted what was then the most complete recording of The Student Prince (with Robert Rounseville as the Prince and Dorothy Kirsten as the barmaid Kathie) in 1952, as well as what was then the most complete recording of Oklahoma! that same year. The Oklahoma! album used Robert Russell Bennett's original orchestrations and starred Nelson Eddy as the cowboy Curly.

For RCA Victor, Engel conducted studio recordings of  Carousel in 1955 (with Robert Merrill as Billy Bigelow, Patrice Munsel as Julie Jordan, and Florence Henderson as Carrie);  and  Show Boat in 1956 (with a very politically incorrect Merrill singing the roles of both Ravenal and the black stevedore Joe, Ms. Munsel as Magnolia, and Risë Stevens as Julie La Verne). These versions were also more complete than previous recordings of these shows.

All of these recordings were eventually issued on CD and were milestones in their time for their completeness.

As author
Engel also wrote several books on musical theatre. One of them, The American Musical Theatre: A Consideration,  was perhaps the very first book to discuss in detail the writing of a Broadway musical, the elements that went into it, and the art of adapting "straight" plays into musicals.

Engel was close friends with Pablo Picasso. He also mentored Maury Yeston, who succeeded him in teaching the BMI Lehman Engel Musical Theater Workshop, Alan Menken, Stephen Flaherty, Andrew MacBean, Joseph Byrd, and Edward Kleban.

References

External links
Lehman Engel Papers at Yale University Music Library

1910 births
1982 deaths
American male composers
American male conductors (music)
Musicians from Jackson, Mississippi
LGBT composers
American LGBT musicians
LGBT people from Mississippi
20th-century American conductors (music)
20th-century American composers
20th-century American male musicians
20th-century American LGBT people